Maplewood is an EP by Ed Harcourt. It was released in 2000. Harcourt recorded the album on a four-track in his grandma's Sussex house, and it was originally intended as a demo.  Upon signing the artist to a record contract, Heavenly Records decided to make it his first solo release. The Guardian described it as "a bedroom-produced gem". Some of the songs were later re-recorded during the sessions for Here Be Monsters. The track "He's Building a Swamp" features Hadrian Garrard on trumpet. Harcourt would later describe the release as "the precocious youngest child record. The one everybody loved dearly and still thinks of very fondly, but it's still full of arrogance".

Track listing
"Hanging With the Wrong Crowd" – 3:32
"I've Become Misguided" – 4:09
"Apple of My Eye" – 3:08
"Attaboy Go Spin a Yarn" – 4:03
"He's Building a Swamp" – 3:17
"Whistle of a Distant Train" – 3:41

References

2000 EPs
Ed Harcourt albums
Heavenly Recordings EPs